Ružindol is a village and municipality of Trnava District in the Trnava region of Slovakia.

References

External links
http://www.statistics.sk/mosmis/eng/run.html
https://www.ruzindol.sk/
http://en.e-obce.sk/obec/ruzindol/ruzindol.html

Villages and municipalities in Trnava District